The Tasmanian Globster was a large unidentified carcass that washed ashore  north of Interview River in western Tasmania, in August 1960. The mass lacked eyes and in place of a mouth, had "soft, tusk-like protuberances". It had a spine, six soft, fleshy 'arms' and stiff, white bristles covering its body. 

The carcass was identified as a whale by L.E. Wall in the journal Tasmanian Naturalist in 1981, and a later electron microscopy analysis of the  collagen fibers confirmed this.

The term globster was coined in 1962 by Ivan T. Sanderson to describe this carcass and the name Sea Santa, coined by another journalist in the same year.

References

Globsters
History of Tasmania
1960 in Australia
August 1960 events in Australia